Elaeocyma splendidula is a species of sea snail, a marine gastropod mollusk in the family Drilliidae.

Description
The shell grows to a length of 28 mm. The whorls are smooth. The shell is longitudinally ribbed below the tuberculate periphery. The tubercles and ribs are slight, the latter curved, and white upon a brownish rose-colored surface.

Distribution
This species occurs in the demersal zone of the Pacific Ocean off the Galapagos Islands.

References

  Tucker, J.K. 2004 Catalog of recent and fossil turrids (Mollusca: Gastropoda). Zootaxa 682:1–1295

External links
 

splendidula
Gastropods described in 1834